Andrew Haswell Green (October 6, 1820 – November 13, 1903) was a lawyer, New York City planner, and civic leader. He is considered "the Father of Greater New York," and is responsible for Central Park, the New York Public Library, the Bronx Zoo, the American Museum of Natural History, and the Metropolitan Museum of Art. He also participated in or led significant projects, such as Riverside Drive, Morningside Park, Fort Washington Park, and protecting the Hudson River Palisades from destruction. His last project was the consolidation of the "Imperial City" or City of Greater New York; he chaired the 1897 committee that drew up the plan of amalgamation.

Early years
Green was born in Worcester, Massachusetts, on October 6, 1820, one of 11 children. In 1835, he moved to New York City, where two of his sisters ran a school for young girls. One of his brothers was Samuel Fisk Green, a medical missionary of the American Ceylon Mission in Sri Lanka.

Green started work in the mercantile trade and befriended a local merchant, who subsequently hired him to manage his sugar refining plantation in Trinidad. Green lived there for about a year, where he kept a daily diary of his activities and thoughts. Green returned to Worcester for a few years before returning to New York City to pursue a legal career.

Career
In 1845, Green became a lawyer under the tutelage of railroad attorney and future U.S. presidential candidate Samuel J. Tilden. The two met at a party and became fast friends, along with Tilden's law partner John Bigelow. In 1854, Green was elected to the New York City school board. He became its president a year later.

From 1857 to 1870, Green was active in or led the Central Park Commission (CPC). The Republican-led New York State Legislature began to institute measures to control the municipal affairs of the largely Democratic metropolitan region; one such act created the Central Park Commission.  In April 1858, Olmsted and Vaux's Greensward Plan for Central Park was chosen by the CPC, thanks largely to Green's influence. The CPC's work would proceed under Green's leadership, despite resistance from resentful local Tammany Hall politicians who had little control of the project after the creation of the CPC.

With Green's coaxing, the legislature began to expand the CPC's authority, transforming it into the city's first comprehensive planning body. In the next decade, the CPC planned and/or proposed improvements in northern Manhattan, the Harlem River, and the Bronx. Projects included Riverside, Morningside and Ft. Washington Parks; the street plan above 155 Street; a widened and straightened Broadway; a Grand Circle at 59th Street and Eighth Avenue, and more. In 1869, Green got approval for the CPC to create the American Museum of Natural History, and the Metropolitan Museum of Art, two public-private institutions.

By 1870, a new home-rule ("Tweed") charter ended the state-run CPC. However, the city's Departments of Public Works and Public Parks would eventually execute most of the CPC's unfinished plans. The Tweed Ring was exposed in 1870, and Green was made New York City Comptroller to sort out the ring's crippling theft and graft. He used his personal credit to obtain funds to cover the city payroll. He cut waste and halted most public works to spare the city from bankruptcy. Some critics claimed his retrenchment policy was too arbitrary and severe. Green served as comptroller until 1876.

Later, the Niagara (Falls) Park Commission was created to establish New York's first state park and defend the falls; Green soon became president of the commission and served until his death in 1903.

In 1886, his legal mentor Samuel Tilden died, leaving a fortune to create a public library for New York City, but his will was contested by relatives. The executors, Green and two others, had to make do with fewer funds. Green successfully proposed consolidating the Tilden Trust with the Astor and Lenox Libraries, leading eventually to the construction of the New York Public Library's Central Building in 1911.

Green was elected a member of the American Antiquarian Society in 1889.

In the 1890s public sentiment built in the business community for municipal consolidation of the metropolitan region to protect the mismanaged port. The state legislature created a commission to explore consolidation, with Green at its head. Green immediately proposed an ambitious consolidation plan that would be rebuffed a number of times, mostly by Brooklynites who called the movement "Green's hobby." In 1894, changing his approach, Green got a nonbinding consolidation referendum on the ballot. Most surrounding municipalities voted in favor of consolidation, but Brooklyn's pro-consolidation majority was razor thin, a scant 277 votes, 64,744 to 64,467.  Alarmed by the results, opponents of consolidation lobbied to thwart subsequent legislative bills by Green and others.

New York state Republican Party boss Thomas C. Platt embraced Green's consolidation plan.  As a result, in 1896, the state legislature passed a law creating a commission to prepare a charter for the City of Greater New York.  The commission submitted its proposed charter to the legislature in February 1897, and the charter became effective on January 1, 1898.  The charter created a municipality so large as to present a new factor in the political institutions of the country.  For the first time, there was a consolidated governmental entity to oversee a great metropolitan city with a population of over 3 million people.  Green's successful efforts resulted in the establishment of Greater New York, the five-borough City that exists today, and earned him the sobriquet "Father of Greater New York".

In 1894, Green rallied preservation-minded New Yorkers against the proposed demolition of the 1812 New York City Hall building. The following year, he formed the city's first formal preservation and conservation group, called the American Scenic and Historic Preservation Society. The society created parks and fought to rescue endangered sites throughout New York City and State; it became defunct in the 1970s. Green became president of the New York Zoological Society, as well, serving from 1895 to 1897.

Death

On November 13, 1903, Green was returning to his home at Park Avenue and 40th Street to have lunch with his family when he was shot five times by a man who had been hiding in wait outside his house.  His assailant, Cornelius Williams, had mistaken him for businessman John R. Platt, the lover of Hannah Elias.

Green's funeral was in New York City and he was buried in Worcester, Massachusetts. In 1905, his family estate in that city was turned into a public park.

Memorials
Several memorials have been erected for Green. In 1929, a memorial bench was dedicated to him in Central Park; It was surrounded by five elms, representing the five boroughs. Bath Island in the Niagara River was renamed Green Island in his honor. In 2010, a 1.98-acre parcel on Manhattan's East Side was named Andrew Haswell Green Park in his honor.

References

External links

 New York's Father is Murdered! The Life and Death of Andrew Haswell Green (2012) Google Books preview
 Andrew Haswell Green: The Father of Greater New York and his Dual Vision of a Cultivated and Consolidated Metropolis (2012) Google Books preview
 Andrew H. Green's Busy Life from The New York Times
 Biography from gothamgazette.com
 Andrew Haswell Green Collection,1843-1911, New-York Historical Society
 Guide to the A.H. Green papers, New York Public Library, Manuscripts and Archives Division
 AH Green collection found, to be auctioned Boston Globe September 5, 2010
 John Plimpton Green Letters Jefferson Digital Commons, Thomas Jefferson University
 The "Forgotten" Father of Greater New York: Andrew Haswell Green from the Museum of the City of New York Collections blog
 The Andrew Haswell Green Collection at the New York Historical Society

1820 births
1903 deaths
Deaths by firearm in Manhattan
Members of the American Antiquarian Society
New York City Comptrollers
19th-century American businesspeople
1903 murders in the United States
Politicians from New York City
Wildlife Conservation Society people